Kai Harada (原田 海 Harada Kai; born May 10, 1999) is a Japanese competition boulderer.

Harada started climbing in 2009 in Osaka. He started competition climbing in 2015, placing in the Youth A Bouldering Championships and the Junior Asian Championships.

In 2018 he won the Bouldering Climbing World Championships as an outsider, and was the only person to get four tops in the final.

In December 2020, Harada's qualification for the Tokyo 2020 Olympics was confirmed after a dispute between the IFSC and the Japan Mountaineering and Sport Climbing Association.

Rankings

Climbing World Cup

Climbing World Championships 
Youth

Adult

Number of medals in the Climbing World Cup

Bouldering

References

External links 

1999 births
Living people
Japanese rock climbers
Sport climbers at the 2020 Summer Olympics
Olympic sport climbers of Japan
IFSC Climbing World Championships medalists
Boulder climbers